Amelia Lake is a lake in Pope County, Minnesota, the United States, located 6.7 miles away from Glenwood. The lake sits on a lot of 910 acres. This lake is open to the public to fish with a proper fishing license.

The lake is not the same as Lake Nokomis, which was also called "Lake Amelia" from at least 1823 until 1910, when its name was changed to that of the grandmother of Hiawatha.

Hydrography
Lake Amelia is one of a chain of four lakes coming south from Lake Leven. The other two lakes are Rice Lake and Lake Villard. Amelia is the source of the east branch of the Chippewa river

Fishing
Lake Amelia offers many different types of fish. Some of the fish at Amelia Lake include: Black Bullhead, Black Crappie, Bluegill, Brown Bullhead, Largemouth Bass, Northern Pike, Pumpkinseed, Rock Bass, Walleye, White Sucker, Yellow Bullhead and Yellow Perch. Chinese mystery snails have been found in Amelia Lake. Minnesota Statue requires boaters to thoroughly check their boats and equipment before entering and leaving the lake.

Stocking
Walleye is the only species that is being stocked in Amelia Lake. Since 2004, they have been continuously stocking the lake's water. They have been stocking fingerlings, yearlings, and fry. The last year that the lake was stocked was 2012. For more information, go to Minnesota Department of Natural Resources.

References

External links
 at Minnesota Department of Natural Resources

Lakes of Minnesota